"25 Minutes to Go" is a song by Shel Silverstein, from his 1962 album Inside Folk Songs.

Lyrics
The song is literally "gallows humor", as it is sung by a man awaiting his own execution by hanging. Each verse consists of two lines, of which the first line is anything from humorous to poignant, and the second line is a minute-by-minute countdown.

Well they're buildin' the gallows outside my cell. 
I got 25 minutes to go.

And in 25 minutes I'll be in hell. 
I got 24 minutes to go.

Well, they give me some beans for my last meal
23 minutes to go

And you know, nobody asked me how I feel
I got 22 minutes to go

So, I wrote to the Governor, the whole damned bunch
Ahhh, 21 minutes to go

And I call up the Mayor, and he's out to lunch
I got 20 more minutes to go

Well, the Sheriff says, "Boy, I wanna watch you die"
19 minutes to go

I laugh in his face and I spit in his eye
I got 18 minutes to go

Well I call out to the Warden to hear my plea
17 minutes to go

He says, "Call me back in a week or three
You've got 16 minutes to go."

Well, my lawyer says he's sorry he missed my case
Mmm, 15 minutes to go

Yeah, well if you're so sorry, come up and take my place
I got 14 minutes to go

Well, now here comes the padre to save my soul
With 13 minutes to go

And he's talkin' about burnin', but I'm so damned cold
I got 12 more minutes to go

Now they're testin' the trap, it chills my spine
I got 11 minutes to go

'Cause the goddamned thing it works just fine
I got 10 more minutes to go

I'm waitin' for the pardon, gonna set me free
With 9 more minutes to go

But this ain't the movies, so to hell with me
I got 8 more minutes to go

And now I'm climbin' up the ladder with a scaffold peg
With 7 more minutes to go

I've better watch my step or else I'll break my leg
I got 6 more minutes to go

Yeah, with my feet on the trap and my head in the noose
5 more minutes to go

Well, c'mon somethin' and cut me loose
I got 4 more minutes to go

I can see the mountains. I see the sky
3 more minutes to go

And it's too damned pretty for a man to die
I got 2 more minutes to go

I can hear the buzzards, hear the crows
One more minute to go

And now I'm swingin' and here I go

The song is similar in concept to Silverstein's children's song "Boa Constrictor": It presents the point of view of someone who is experiencing a calamity in "real time," composing and singing as the events unfold, with a fatal conclusion. "Boa Constrictor", like "25 Minutes to Go", appeared on Silverstein's 1962 album Inside Folk Songs. Johnny Cash was the second artist to do a cover of the song where it differs most notably by having omitted lines.

Later versions
 Brothers Four, on their 1963 album Cross Country Concert.
 Johnny Cash on his 1965 album Sings the Ballads of the True West and on his 1968 live album, At Folsom Prison.
 Danish singer Povl Dissing with the band The Beefeaters as "25 Minutter endnu" (1967 single).
 Flemish singer Will Tura from Belgium as "20 minuten geduld" in 1968.
 Swedish folk singer :sv:Ewert Ljusberg on Goknul (1972).
 American avant-garde singer Diamanda Galás on Malediction & Prayer (1998, Asphodel Records).
 British cult band Tiger Lillies on 2 Penny Opera (2001).
 American country/rock band Pine Valley Cosmonauts on The Executioner's Last Songs (2002).
 German metal band Dezperadoz on their third album An Eye for an Eye.
 German singer Gunter Gabriel on his Album The Tennessee-Recordings (2003).
 American rock band Pearl Jam on their 2004 album Live at Benaroya Hall.
Canadian band Head of the Herd on their first album On the House 
 Berlin-based band Dangerpony (Laura Bruce, Laurent Lavolé and others)
 Lou Reed and Emily Haines performed a version in 2011 at Shelebration! A tribute to the works of Shel Silverstein

Notes

Johnny Cash songs
Shel Silverstein songs
1962 songs
Works about capital punishment
Songs about death
Songs written by Shel Silverstein
Black comedy music
The Brothers Four songs